Josep Pintat may refer to:

Josep Pintat Solans (1925–2007), prime minister of Andorra
Josep Pintat Forné (born 1960), Andorran politician, son of the above